Mighty Sports (sometimes referred to as Strong Group or Mighty Sports - Go for Gold for sponsorship reasons) is a basketball team based in the Philippines playing in various domestic tournaments. The team won four championships in the Republica Cup in 2013, 2014, 2016 and 2018.

The team represented the Philippines when they participated in the 2016 William Jones Cup in Taiwan, their first international tournament which they won with a sweep bearing a record of 8–0.

They have competed in the Dubai International Basketball Championship participating in the 2017, 2019, 2020 editions. They became the first team based outside the Middle East to win the Dubai tournament in the 2020 edition. The squad was also the Philippine representative in the 2019 William Jones Cup.

Mighty Sports is the athletic arm of sportswear manufacturing company Mighty Sports Apparel and Accessories, Inc.

Competitive record

Republica Cup
Mighty Sports became first known to basketball fans in minor basketball leagues such as the Republica Cup (an invitational basketball tournament held in Malolos, Bulacan as part of the commemoration of the First Philippine Republic, known as the Malolos Convention). It also sponsored the Adamson Falcons men's basketball team and the Bulacan State University Golden Gears men's basketball team in the Filsports Basketball Association, and the Philippine Dragon Boat Team.

In 2014, the team, led by former PBA player Kenneth Duremdes and Kris Rosales, bagged the second Republica Cup title, after winning the finals game against Malolos Republica, 86–84. One year later, the team did not make it to the finals after losing the semifinals match against AMA University.

On February 4, 2016, Mighty Sports, now-led by former UAAP MVP Kiefer Ravena, successfully reclaimed the Republica Cup championship, beating Hobe Mackway Travel in the finals game, 85–82. In addition, Bright Akhuetie was named as the Tournament MVP.

Pilipinas Commercial Basketball League
In March 2016, the team joined the Pilipinas Commercial Basketball League. Historically, this is the first entry into a major basketball league. Ravena, a 2016 PBA draft prospect, together with Ty Tang, who came out of retirement in the Philippine Basketball Association, and import Bright Akhuetie are some of the players who retained in the team's line-up for the Champion's Cup.

Mighty Sports also appointed Bo Perasol as team consultant, Mike Fermin as head coach and Charles Tiu as assistant coach of the team, which is one of the two new teams that competed in the 2016 PCBL Chairman's Cup, alongside SCTEX Road Warriors.

On its first game, Mighty Sports completes an upset victory against Founder's Cup champion Jumbo Plastic Linoleum Giants, 79–70 in the opening day of Champion's Cup on March 6, 2016. Ravena led the team's campaign with 16 points.

William Jones Cup

2016
The team represented the Philippines in the 2016 William Jones Cup, with 7 foreign reinforcements leading the team, in lieu of the Gilas Cadets who were not available for playing. They beat team A of host nation Taiwan, who were fielding a second team, on their opening match. They then beat the South Korea national team on their second match. They won their third match against the US team Sacramento State Hornets. They beat Japan on their fourth by a blowout of 21 points. They faced the India national team on their fifth match and won by a 20 points margin to remain the only unbeaten team as of the 6th day of the tournament. They cemented the tournament's title by beating Iran on their 6th match. Mighty Sports continued their winning streak by beating Egypt in their seventh match and swept the entire competition beating Taiwanese Team B.

2019
Mighty Sports will once again represent the Philippines in the 2019 William Jones Cup from July 12 to 21 in Chinese-Taipei. Charles Tiu returns to lead the coaching staff and his mentor, former Gilas Pilipinas head coach, Rajko Toroman will be the lead assistant.  It was also announced that Jeremiah Gray, Roosevelt Adams, Aaron Black, 2019 MPBL Datu Cup MVP Gab Banal, Jason Brickman and Joseph Yeo will suit up for the team.

Mighty Sports captured their second Jones Cup title after defeating Taiwan-A, 83-76 for a 7–0 record.  They then swept the competition after with an 8–0 record.

Merlion Cup
Singapore's Merlion Cup Tournament was revived in 2016 and the Mighty Sports were invited as the Philippines' representative.  They beat the Seoul Samsung Thunders on their opening match. They advanced into the semifinals round after beating Westports Malaysia Dragons, and eventually won against Singapore Slingers. They advanced in the finals and faced Shanghai Sharks in which they suffered a defeat, placing them in second after Jimmer Fredette scored three freethrows with no time left on the clock.

Dubai International Basketball Tournament

2017
Mighty Sports joined the 2017 Dubai International Basketball Championship with only a couple of weeks to prepare. The tournament took place from February 18 to 25, 2017.

Mighty Sports was led by NBA veterans Hasheem Thabeet, Dominic McGuire, Justin Brownlee and naturalized player Marcus Douthit. Chris Tiu and center Beau Belga bannered the local cast along with other PBA veterans JC Intal, Gary David, Ryan Araña and two-time PBA MVP Willie Miller who were added in the team's lineup. Amateur standouts Kiefer Ravena, Jeron Teng and Jett Manuel were also added in the team's roster.

Due to the lack of cohesion and team chemistry, they lost to host team Al Ahli, 83-75 in the opening day. In their second game, they lost to the Egypt national basketball team, 84–82, after Ravena's three point attempt, in the last 6 seconds of the game, failed. The day after, they also lost in a close game to Lebanese powerhouse Sagesse 95–92.  The team managed to beat Ball Above All with a score of 94–80 to end their stint in the tournament with a single win.

2019
Mighty Sports participated in the Dubai tournament in February 2019 with SMDC, Oriental Group, Healthcube and Go for Gold as the team's main sponsors.

For their 2019 Dubai stint, the team hired the services of former NBA two-time champion Lamar Odom, Ginebra resident import Justin Brownlee, and Chinese Basketball Association import Randolph Morris. Notable local signings include former Ginebra guard Jett Manuel, University of the Philippines playmaker Juan Gomez de Liano, Gabriel Banal, Joseph Yeo, La Salle forward Santi Santillan, De La Salle-College of St. Benilde high flyer Justin Gutang and Mono Vampire guard Jason Brickman.

The team also signed Fil-Am prospects Jeremiah Gray and Roosevelt Adams followed by National University big man Troy Rike to complete the lineup.

Mighty Sports finished third winning over the Homenetmen Lebanon in the third-place play off. They only lost once, to Lebanese club Al Riyadi in the semifinal.

2020
Mighty Sports made their third appearance at the Dubai International Basketball Championship in 2020. They became the first team based outside the Middle East to win the tournament when they won 92–81 over Al Riyadi Beirut in the final. Mighty Sports player Renaldo Balkman was named the tournament's Most Valuable Player.

2023
For the 2023 Dubai International Basketball Championship, Mighty Sport itself would not be returning. Instead Strong Group Realty of Jacob Lao, which Mighty and Acto City sponsored, competed in their stead. Strong Group, also coached by Charles Tiu, failed to repeat Mighty's feat, and finished as quarterfinalists.

Partnerships
Mighty Sports had a partnership with the Bulacan Kuyas of the Maharlika Pilipinas Basketball League (MPBL) in the 2018 MPBL Datu Cup as the team's corporate sponsor. In 2023, Mighty Sport sponsored  Strong Group Realty's basketball team which entered the 2023 Dubai International Basketball Championship.

Brand image
The sportswear manufacturing company behind Mighty Sports adopted its logo in July 2019 which is also used by its sports teams. It consist of an "M" with a three-pronged crown.

Roster

2020 Dubai International Basketball Championship
The following is the 12-man roster of the Mighty Sports-Go for Gold for the 2020 Dubai International Basketball Championship.

 

 

 
 

|}
| style="vertical-align:top;" |
 Head coach
 Charles Tiu
 Assistant coaches
 Will Voigt
 Dean Castaño
 Tyrone Tang
 Paolo Layug
 Team manager
 Wowie Evangelista

Legend
(C) Team captain
(I) Import
Nat. – Flags indicate national team   eligibility at FIBA sanctioned events
Age – describes ageon January 9, 2019
|}

Past
2019 William Jones Cup
The following is the 12-man roster of the Mighty Sports-Go for Gold for the 2019 William Jones Cup.

 

 
 
 

|}
| style="vertical-align:top;" |
 Head coach
 Charles Tiu
 Assistant coaches
 Woody Co
 Dean Castaño
 Team manager
 Wowie Evangelista

Legend
(C) Team captain
(I) Import
Nat. – Flags indicate national team   eligibility at FIBA sanctioned events
Age – describes ageon January 9, 2019
|}

2017 Dubai International Basketball Tournament
The following was the 14-man roster of the PH-Mighty Sports  for the 2017 Dubai International Basketball Tournament.

 

 
 
 

 

 
|}
| style="vertical-align:top;" |
 Head coach
 Charles Tiu
 Assistant coach
 Sandy Arespacochaga
 Moriah Gingerich
 Mike Fermin
 Team manager
 Jean Michael Alabanza

Legend
(C) Team captain
(I) Import
Nat. – Flags indicate national team   eligibility at FIBA sanctioned events
Age – describes ageon February 18, 2017
|}

2016 Merlion Cup
The following was the 14-man roster of the PH-Mighty Sports  for the 2016 Merlion Cup.

 
 
  
 
 

   

 
|}
| style="vertical-align:top;" |
 Head coach
 Charles Tiu
 Assistant coach
 Dominic Uy
 Moriah Gingerich
 Team manager
 Jean Michael Alabanza

Legend
(C) Team captain
(I) Import
Nat. – Flags indicate national team   eligibility at FIBA sanctioned events
Age – describes ageon September 21, 2016
|}

Depth chart

2016 William Jones Cup
The following was the 14-man roster of the Philippine Mighty Sports for the 2016 William Jones Cup.

Honors

Domestic
Republica Cup
 Winners (4): 2013, 2014, 2016, 2018

Pilipinas Commercial Basketball League
 Runner-up (1): 2016 Chairman's Cup

International Invitational
William Jones Cup
 Winners (2): 2016, 2019

Merlion Cup
 Runners-up (1): 2016

Notable players 
Note: Players mentioned below are NBA Veterans and Naturalized Filipinos only who played and received various awards.

References

Maharlika Pilipinas Basketball League
Pilipinas Commercial Basketball League
Basketball teams in the Philippines